Tianjin Quanjian F.C. is a professional Chinese football club that currently participates in the Chinese Super League division under licence from the Chinese Football Association (CFA). The team is based in Tianjin and their home stadium is the Haihe Educational Football Stadium that has a seating capacity of 30,000. Their current owners are Quanjian Nature Medicine who officially took over the club on 7 July 2015.

Transfers

In

Winter

Out

Winter

Pre-season and friendlies

Training matches

Competitions

Chinese Super League

Table

Results by round

Results summary

Chinese FA Cup

References

Tianjin Tianhai F.C. seasons
Chinese football clubs 2017 season